Hulodes gravata is a species of moth of the family Erebidae. It is found in Indonesia (Irian Jaya, Seram) and New Guinea.

Subspecies
Hulodes gravata gravata
Hulodes gravata seranensis Prout, 1932 (Seram)

References

Moths described in 1932
Hulodes
Moths of Indonesia
Moths of New Guinea